German submarine U-221 was a Type VIIC U-boat of Nazi Germany's Kriegsmarine during World War II.

Ordered on 15 August 1940 from the Germaniawerft shipyard in Kiel, she was laid down on 16 June 1941 as yard number 651, launched on 14 March 1942 and commissioned on 9 May 1942 under the command of Kapitänleutnant Hans-Hartwig Trojer.

In addition, she damaged one ship with a total tonnage of 7,197 GRT.

Design
German Type VIIC submarines were preceded by the shorter Type VIIB submarines. U-221 had a displacement of  when at the surface and  while submerged. She had two shafts and two  propellers.

U-221 was fitted with five  torpedo tubes (four fitted at the bow and one at the stern), fourteen torpedoes, one  SK C/35 naval gun, 220 rounds, and a  C/30 anti-aircraft gun. The boat had a complement of between forty-four and sixty.

Service history

U-221 is also credited with the destruction of ten allied landing craft (nine LCMs and one LCT) that were lost aboard the British merchantman Southern Empress when that vessel was torpedoed and sunk on 14 October 1942.

First patrol

U-221 departed Kristiansand on 3 September 1942 having moved to the Norwegian port a day earlier. Her route took her through the gap between Iceland and the Faroe Islands. In the same attack, she sank Ashworth and Senta. There were no survivors from either vessel.
 
The next day two more ships fell to the torpedoes of the German U-boat. The Susana went down in six minutes northeast of St. Johns; Southern Empress was sent to the bottom, taking a deck cargo of ten landing craft with her.

U-221 docked in St Nazaire on 22 October.

Second patrol

The boat's second foray was one of anti-climax and tragedy. Although she scoured the Atlantic west of Ireland, she failed to find any targets. On 8 December U-221 and  collided in heavy fog, resulting in the loss of the latter boat. U-221 was badly damaged. Unable to dive, Oberleutnant zur See Trojer aborted the patrol and returned to St. Nazaire.

Third patrol

Her third sortie was more fruitful. The Jamaica was destroyed on 7 March 1943. This ship took just two minutes to find a watery grave, followed by Tucurina on the tenth, southeast of Cape Farewell, (Greenland). In the same attack, the U-boat sank Andrea F. Luckenbach and damaged  (probably due to a dud torpedo).

Retribution was swift; the convoy's escorts from HX 228 caused some damage to U-221. Repairs were carried out at sea, enabling the boat to sink two more ships on 18 March; Canadian Star and Walter Q. Gresham were added to her list of 'kills'.

Fourth patrol

U-221 only sank one ship on this patrol, Sandanger; the survivors had a remarkable escape. Occupying the only intact lifeboat, they found themselves in an area of low pressure created by the ship's burning fuel cargo. The flames were split in two by strong winds which also kept them above the men's heads by only a few feet as they rowed clear of the location.

Fifth patrol and loss

U-221 left St. Nazaire for the last time on 20 September 1943. On the 27th she was attacked by a Handley Page Halifax of No. 58 Squadron RAF with eight depth charges southwest of Ireland. The U-boat was seen to sink by the stern but the aircraft was also hit, forcing the pilot to ditch about three miles from the encounter. Two gunners from the Halifax were lost; the U-boat was sunk with all hands (50 men).

Wolfpacks
U-221 took part in twelve wolfpacks, namely:
 Pfeil (12 – 22 September 1942) 
 Blitz (22 – 26 September 1942) 
 Tiger (26 – 30 September 1942) 
 Wotan (5 – 18 October 1942) 
 Draufgänger (29 November - 9 December 1942) 
 Neuland (8 – 13 March 1943) 
 Dränger (14 – 20 March 1943) 
 Drossel (11 – 15 May 1943) 
 Oder (17 – 19 May 1943) 
 Mosel (19 – 24 May 1943) 
 Trutz (1 – 16 June 1943) 
 Trutz 3 (16 – 29 June 1943)

Summary of raiding history

See also

References

Notes

Citations

Bibliography

External links

German Type VIIC submarines
World War II submarines of Germany
U-boats commissioned in 1942
U-boats sunk in 1943
U-boats sunk by British aircraft
1942 ships
World War II shipwrecks in the Atlantic Ocean
Ships built in Kiel
U-boats sunk by depth charges
Ships lost with all hands
U-boat accidents
Maritime incidents in September 1943